IMCL may refer to:

 Indian Made Country Liquor or Desi daru
 ImClone Systems